The 3000 and 5000 metres distances for women in the 2009–10 ISU Speed Skating World Cup were contested over six races on six occasions, out of a total of nine World Cup occasions for the season, with the first occasion taking place in Berlin, Germany, on 6–8 November 2009, and the final occasion taking place in Heerenveen, Netherlands, on 12–14 March 2010.

Martina Sáblíková of the Czech Republic successfully defended her title from the previous season, while Stephanie Beckert of Germany came second, and Daniela Anschütz-Thoms, also of Germany, came third.

Top three

Race medallists

Final standings
Standings as of 14 March 2010 (end of the season).

References

Women 3000
ISU